Kaito Mizuta (born 8 April 2000) is a Japanese footballer who plays as a midfielder, winger, and forward for Mainz 05.

Career

In 2019, Mizuta signed for German fifth tier side SV Straelen, helping them earn promotion to the German fourth tier. In 2021, he signed for Mainz 05 in the German Bundesliga.

References

External links

 

1. FSV Mainz 05 players
1. FSV Mainz 05 II players
2000 births
Living people
Association football forwards
Association football midfielders
Association football wingers
Expatriate footballers in Germany
Association football people from Tokyo
Japanese expatriate footballers
Japanese expatriate sportspeople in Germany
Japanese footballers
Regionalliga players
SV 19 Straelen players